Birupakshya is the holy god of Kirat people's located in Kathmandu erected by Kirati kings of ancient Nepal, believed to be an ancestor. It is also known as Kirateswor Mahadev.  Kirat people are diverse and therefore their beliefs and deities vary. Birupakshya is also worshipped in South India as Virupaksha.

An idol of Virupaksha is located in the east of Pashupatinath Temple in the right bank of Bagmati river. Half of the body of Virupaksha lies inside ground and another half above. The statue is believed to be emerging out slowly. It is believed that the world will be destroyed if the whole statue will come out. Virupaksha is also called as kali because his full emergence will end the Kali Yuga.

Mythology
There are various mythological stories related to Virupaksha originating from Puranas and Mahapuranas.

According to one mythology, Virupaksha is a god of kirat people and statue was built by kirati people of ancient Nepal. His statue is  believed to be buried due to the earthquake in this version.

In another story, Virupaksha is believed to be the chief of Nāgas, the gatekeepers of lord shiva.

Yet in another story related to Virupaksha is described as a children from a poor family. His father left home in search of work and didn't return. After few years when Virupaksha was seven years old, he went to search his father. Few years passed but he could not find his father. One day he went to a cave to take shelter where he met a lady. It was night and he could not recognize her and had a sexual relationship with her. In the morning when he saw the lady, he was shocked to see his own mother. It is believed that from that day, Kaliyuga started. Filled of guilt Virupaksha went to Pashupatinath temple where he saw lord Shiva preparing some intoxication. Shiva told him to open the lid of hot utensil. While opening the lid, Virupaksha's face got burnt  by the heat of copper vessel. His face became black from which he got the name Kurup. He cursed lord shiva and went to Buddha who was meditating nearby. Buddha gave him a garland and asked him to chant until the garland wilted. He started chanting near the Bagmati river. He got frustrated after a long chanting because garland did not wilt so he left for his home. On the way to home, he saw a boy was scratching iron rod. Virupaksha asked the boy why he was doing that. The boy replied that he wanted to make a needle to sew his torn clothes. Inspired by the boy's determination, Virupaksha returned to meditate. When people saw him chanting with Buddha's garland in Pashupati premises, they buried him in the ground because he had insulted Shiva earlier. It is believed that Virupaksha will take revenge with the people of earth when he will be released from the ground.

References

Asian gods
Pashupatinath Temple